The Illicit Happiness of Other People  is a 2012 drama novel by Manu Joseph.

Plot
Set in the Madras of the 1990s. Ousep Chacko is a journalist and a wannabe novelist who routinely wakes the neighbors after drinking sprees and then threatens to hang himself from his lungi. His wife, Mariamma, talks to walls; Thoma, their son, has fallen for an older girl. The family, though disintegrating, is united in its grief, for three years ago Thoma's 17-year-old brother, Unni, fell from the balcony. A desperate Ousep sets out to solve the mystery of his son's supposed suicide.

Reception
Malcolm Forbes of Star Tribune wrote: "What could have been another standard tale of a dysfunctional family coming apart at the seams turns out to be something far more complex and clever." Martin Patriquin of Maclean's reviewed, "Visceral and at times hilarious, Illicit is an indictment of a society that has surrendered to the baser instincts of its men." Sam Sacks of The Wall Street Journal said that the novel "injects dark, rueful laughter into an immensely touching story of loss." 

Arminta Wallace of The Irish Times called it a "blend of philosophical inquiry and tart social commentary" which is "smartly written and consistently entertaining". Deepanjana Pal of Daily News and Analysis wrote that the novel is "fun, despite all the unhappiness that riddles the novel, and Joseph avoids the curse of the second novel with panache." Chrsity Edwall of The Daily Telegraph wrote: "Joseph twists what I feared would be a book for people wanting a second White Tiger (that is, local son makes good in a shady world) into a cocktail of character, culture and religion."

References

External link
The Illicit Happiness of Other People at HarperCollins

2012 Indian novels
Indian English-language novels
Novels about death
Novels set in Tamil Nadu
Novels set in the 1990s
HarperCollins books